Jay B. Heimowitz (born December 26, 1937) is an American poker player from Bethel, New York. Heimowitz was one of the original players to help establish the Mayfair Club as a premier poker house.

Heimowitz started playing poker for baseball cards at the age of 9. He went on to join the U.S. Army; by the time he left the service at age 21, Heimowitz had won approximately $10,000 playing against his fellow servicemen.

Heimowitz used this money to invest in a beer company, which he later sold to Budweiser.

Heimowitz has attended the World Series of Poker (WSOP) since 1975 and has won six bracelets:

Heimowitz is one of only three players, the other two being Phil Hellmuth and Billy Baxter, in World Series of Poker history to have won a bracelet in four different decades.

Heimowitz won a Poker After Dark title on his sole appearance, earning $120,000. The show was themed around former Mayfair Club regulars with a table composed of Heimowitz, Mickey Appleman, Dan Harrington,  Mike Shichtman, Howard Lederer, and Steve Zolotow.

As of 2019, Heimowitz has made $2,121,439 in live tournament winnings. His 43 cashes at the WSOP account for $1,526,581 of those winnings.

Outside poker, Heimowitz enjoys keeping himself fit. He lives with his wife Carole (they married in 1960.) They have four sons (Eddie, Lonnie, Roy, and Neil) and nine grandchildren (Katelyn, Jaclyn, Angelo, Max, Sofia, Jake, Anatoly, Casey, and Neil Patrick).

References

External links
 Hendon Mob tournament results

1937 births
Living people
People from Bethel, New York
American poker players
Jewish American sportspeople
Super Bowl of Poker event winners
World Series of Poker bracelet winners
Poker After Dark tournament winners
American sports businesspeople
United States Army soldiers
21st-century American Jews